Kevin Zhu may refer to:
 Kevin Zhu (academic)
 Kevin Zhu (violinist)